Max Donald Mackinnon, (born 31 December 1980) who performs as Esoterik or Eso, is an Australian hip hop recording artist and founding member of Bliss n Eso since 2000. He was nominated for the 2018 ARIA Award for Best Urban Album for his solo nine-track extended play, My Astral Plane (May 2018). The EP had reached the ARIA Albums Chart top 50.

Discography

Extended plays

Singles

References

Australian musicians
Living people
1980 births